The Indo English School, Rourkela is an Indian school, located in Rourkela, Odisha.

History and operations
Founded by educationist Mihir Baran Mukherjee and Manju Mukherjee in 1974 with five local students, the school has grown to 1,300 students.

It is recognized by the government of Odisha and affiliated to the Council for the Indian School Certificate Examinations, New Delhi. The school follows the Indian Certificate of Secondary Education (Class X) and Indian School Certificate (Class XII) (Commerce) curricula.

The school provides scholarships to students from less-privileged backgrounds as well as running four rural English-medium schools within a  radius of Rourkela.

Education is a mix of academics, arts, athletics, co-curricular activities and a strong sense of community service. Projects and awards in science, arts and social sciences are an important feature of the curriculum.  NCC, scouts and guides have played an important part of the school program for years, with several students taking part in the Republic Day Camp at New Delhi.

See also
Education in India
 List of schools in Odisha

References

External links
 , the school's official website

Primary schools in India
High schools and secondary schools in Odisha
Schools in Rourkela
Educational institutions established in 1974
1974 establishments in Orissa